The disappearance of Nathan O'Brien, Kathryn Liknes and Alvin Liknes occurred on June 29, 2014. Five-year-old Nathan O'Brien and his grandparents, Kathryn and Alvin Liknes, disappeared from the grandparents' Calgary, Alberta home after what police called a "violent incident." An amber alert was issued. This alert was lifted on July 14, 2014 after the arrest of a person in relation to the disappearance. Later on July 14, 2014, police state that they believe O'Brien and the Likneses were murdered, but they did not recover their bodies. Douglas Garland was charged with two counts of first degree murder in the deaths of the Likneses and a second-degree murder charge for allegedly killing O'Brien. The second degree charge for Nathan O'Brien was upgraded by the court to a first degree charge in May 2015.

Trial
The murder trial for Garland began on January 16, 2017. The trial drew to a close on February 16, 2017, and it took the jurors just over nine hours to reach a verdict of guilty on all three counts of first degree murder.

The following morning, Garland was sentenced, with only the minimum sentence being determined, as first degree murder carries an automatic life sentence. After 10 of the 12 jurors recommended that Garland receive consecutive minimum sentences, Judge David Gates ordered Garland be required to serve 75 years before being eligible for parole. As Garland would have to live to 129 years of age to serve that term, this means he will, effectively, be incarcerated for the rest of his life. Throughout the trial, Garland never showed any remorse or emotion. Hours after being sentenced, Garland was sent to the Calgary Remand Centre located in the city's Northwest where he was physically assaulted by multiple inmates. EMS said the victim of the assault was transported to hospital in stable, non-life-threatening condition with soft tissue injuries.

See also
List of people who disappeared

References 

2010s missing person cases
2014 crimes in Canada
Disappearance of Nathan O'Brien, Kathryn Liknes and Alvin Liknes
Child abduction in Canada
History of Calgary
Kidnapped Canadian people
Murder convictions without a body
Missing person cases in Canada